Linha de Sintra is a railway line which connects the stations of Rossio and Sintra, in Portugal. The railway was one of the first to be planned in Portugal, and was opened on 2 April 1887. The southern terminus was changed from Alcântara-Terra to Rossio, after the station was inaugurated in June 1891. The duplication works were completed on 20 January 1949, and during the 1950s the line was electrified. New rolling stock was introduced in the 1990s.

See also 
 List of railway lines in Portugal
 History of rail transport in Portugal

References

Sources

Sintra
Iberian gauge railways
Railway lines opened in 1887